This timeline lists the foundation dates of the national governing bodies for rugby union—known as rugby unions  or federations. The first union was the Rugby Football Union (RFU) that was founded in 1871 to govern rugby union within England. It was founded following the first ever rugby union international, played between England and Scotland in 1871. The Scottish Football Union (later renamed the Scottish Rugby Union) was then founded in 1873, the Irish Rugby Football Union in 1879 and the Welsh Rugby Union in 1881.

Timeline
1871 (English) Rugby Football Union (RFU)
1873 Scottish Rugby Union (as Scottish Football Union until 1924)
1879 Irish Rugby Football Union (a merger of two Irish unions both formed in 1874)
1881 Welsh Rugby Union
1889 South African Rugby Board (merged with South African Rugby Union in 1992 to form South African Rugby Football Union; merged body renamed South African Rugby Union in 2005)
1892 New Zealand Rugby (founded as New Zealand Rugby Football Union, known as New Zealand Rugby Union from 2006–2013)
1895 Rhodesia Rugby Football Union (Zimbabwe RU after 1980)
1899 Argentine Rugby Union
1900 German Rugby Federation
1908 Sri Lanka Rugby Football Union (as Ceylon Rugby Football Union)
1913 Fiji Rugby Union (founded as Fiji Rugby Football Union)
1916 Royal Moroccan Rugby Federation
1919 French Rugby Federation
1920 Guyana Rugby Football Union
1921 Malaysian Rugby Union (As Malaya Rugby Union)
1922 Catalan Rugby Federation
1923 Spanish Rugby Federation
1923 Tonga Rugby Football Union
1923 Samoa Rugby Football Union
1923 Kenya Rugby Football Union (as Rugby Football Union of Kenya)
1926 Japan Rugby Football Union
1926 Portuguese Rugby Federation
1926 Czech Rugby Union (as Czechoslovakia)
1928 Italian Rugby Federation
1928 Trinidad and Tobago Rugby Football Union
1931 Romanian Rugby Federation
1932 Dutch Rugby Union
1932 Swedish Rugby Union
1934 Hellenic Rugby Federation
1935 Belgian Rugby Federation
1935 Chilean Rugby Federation (as Rugby Union of Chile)
1936 Rugby Union of Russia (founded as, and successor of, Rugby Union of the Soviet Union)
1937 Thai Rugby Union
1946 Korean Rugby Union
1946 Chinese Taipei Rugby Union
1948 Singapore Rugby Union
1949 Rugby Australia (founded as Australian Rugby Union; renamed in 2017) 
1950 Danish Rugby Union
1951 Uruguayan Rugby Union
1952 Niue Rugby Football Union
1953 Hong Kong Rugby Football Union
1953 Rugby Football Union of East Africa (umbrella organization that includes Kenya, Tanzania, and Uganda)
1954 Rugby Union of Serbia (as Yugoslavia)
1956 Royal Moroccan Rugby Federation
1957 Polish Rugby Union
1958 Jamaica Rugby Football Union
1959 Uganda Rugby Union (as URFU)
1960 Senegalese Rugby Federation
1960 British Virgin Islands Rugby Football Union
1960 Latvian Rugby Federation (as regional body of USSR)
1961 Côte d'Ivoire Rugby Federation
1961 Lithuanian Rugby Federation (as regional body under USSR - full nation body in 1990s)
1962 Bulgarian Rugby Federation
1962 Croatian Rugby Federation (as part of Yugoslavia)
1963 Madagascan Rugby Federation
1963 Solomon Islands Rugby Union Federation
1963 Papua New Guinea Rugby Football Union
1963 Brazilian Rugby Confederation (as Rugby Union of Brazil)
1964 Georgia Rugby Union (as regional body under USSR - full nation body in 1990s)
1964 Barbados Rugby Football Union
1964 Bermuda Rugby Football Union
1964 Norwegian Rugby Union
1965 Rugby Canada (founded as Canadian Rugby Union)
1967 Martinique Rugby Committee (territorial committee of French Rugby Federation)
1968 Indian Rugby Football Union
1968 Finnish Rugby Federation
1970 Paraguayan Rugby Union
1971 Cayman Rugby Football Union
1971 Israel Rugby Union
1972 Swiss Rugby Federation
1972 Tunisian Rugby Federation
1973 Mexican Rugby Federation
1973 Bahamas Rugby Football Union
1974 Arabian Gulf Rugby Football Union (founded as Gulf Rugby Football Union) — then an overseas member of the Rugby Football Union; became independent in 1990. Officially disbanded in 2011; to be replaced with separate national unions in each of its former member countries. The new United Arab Emirates union was founded shortly before the AGRFU dissolution.
1974 Luxembourg Rugby Federation
1974 Saint Lucia Rugby Football Union
1975 USA Rugby (founded as United States of America Rugby Football Union)
1975 Zambia Rugby Football Union
1979 Kazakhstan Rugby Union (as regional association of USSR - full national body in 1994)
1977 Brunei Rugby Football Union
1980 Vanuatu Rugby Football Union
1986 Andorran Rugby Federation
1989 Tahiti Rugby Union
1989 Cook Islands Rugby Union
1989 Rugby Association of Slovenia
1990 Namibia Rugby Union
1990 Hungarian Rugby Union
1990 Austrian Rugby Federation
1990 American Samoa Rugby Union
1991 Venezuelan Rugby Federation
1991 National Rugby Federation of Ukraine
1991 Malta Rugby Football Union
1992 Botswana Rugby Union
1992 Moldovan Rugby Federation
1992 Nepal Rugby Association
1992  Bosnia and Herzegovina Rugby Federation
1992 South African Rugby Union (founded as South Africa Rugby Football Union, a merger of the white South African Rugby Board and the non-racial South African Rugby Union; adopted current name in 2005)
1993 Rugby Union Mauritius
1995 Swaziland Rugby Union
1996 Monegasque Rugby Federation
1996 Chinese Rugby Football Association
1996 Macau Rugby Union
1997 Peruvian Rugby Federation
1997 Cameroonian Rugby Federation
1997 Guam Rugby Football Union
1998 Philippine Rugby Football Union
1998 Nigeria Rugby Football Federation
1998 Libyan Rugby Association
1998 Saint Vincent and the Grenadines Rugby Union
2000 Pakistan Rugby Union
2001 Lao Rugby Federation
2001 Togolese Rugby Federation
2001 Burundian Rugby Federation
2001 Malian Rugby Federation
2001 Cambodian Federation of Rugby
2001 Turks and Caicos Islands Rugby Football Union
2003 Mongolian Rugby Football Union
2003 Rwandan Rugby Federation
2004 Azerbaijani Rugby Federation
2004 Uzbekistan Rugby Federation
2004 Dominican Rugby Federation
2004 Persatuan Rugby Union Indonesia
2004 Rugby Association of Panama
2004 Slovak Rugby Union
2005 Ghana Rugby Football Union
2005 Sammarinese Rugby Federation
2006 Cyprus Rugby Federation
2007 Jordan Rugby Union
2007 Estonian Rugby Union
2007 Guatemalan Rugby Association
2007 Tuvalu Rugby Union
2007 Algerian Rugby Federation
2008 Ecuadorian Rugby Federation
2008 Egyptian Rugby Football Union
2009 Turkey Rugby Federation
2009 Lebanese Rugby Union Federation
2009 UAE Rugby Federation
2009 Rugby Federation of Costa Rica
2010 Qatar Rugby Federation
2010 Rugby Iceland
2010 Afghanistan Rugby Federation
2010 Liechtenstein Rugby Union
2012 Federation of Lesotho Rugby
2012 Comorian Rugby Federation
2012 Syrian High Rugby Committee
2012 Rugby Belize
2013 Rugby Union of Belarus
2015 Haitian Rugby Federation

See also
History of rugby union
World Rugby

References and notes

External links

Timelines of sports
History of rugby union
Rugby union-related lists